The 2018 Dallas Cup, known as the Dr Pepper Dallas Cup for sponsorship reasons, was the thirty-ninth edition of a youth football competition held in the United States. Competitions were held at every age from U13s to U19s. The U14 and U19 levels also had additional competitions, known as the U14s UDN and the Gordon Jago Supergroup respectively.

Gordon Jago Supergroup

Participants

Source:Dallas Cup

Matches

Group A

Group B

Group C

Knockout stage

Semi-finals

Final

Media coverage

Overall winners

Source:Dallas Cup

References

External links
Dallas Cup website

Dallas Cup
Dallas Cup
Dallas Cup
Dallas Cup